is a railway station located in Tomioka (富岡), Bifuka, Nakagawa District (Teshio), Hokkaidō, and is operated by the Hokkaido Railway Company.

Lines serviced
Hokkaido Railway Company
Sōya Main Line

Adjacent stations

External links
Ekikara Time Table - JR Hatsuno Station

Railway stations in Hokkaido Prefecture
Railway stations in Japan opened in 1959